Zawoja  is a village in southern Poland located close to Maków Podhalański. It is situated in Sucha County (Lesser Poland Voivodeship). With neighbouring village of Skawica it constitutes a rural Zawoja Commune. It has 6,200 inhabitants (2001) and is often mentioned as one of the biggest Polish villages. It is also very often referred as the longest one as it stretches for about 20 kilometres in a picturesque mountain valley.

It is situated close to a mountain massif of Babia Góra (1725 m). The headquarters of Babia Góra National Park is located here. Since 19th century Zawoja is one of the important mountain resorts in Poland. It is known for its wooden architecture and folk culture of Babia Góra Gorals.

See also
LOT Polish Airlines Flight LO 165 crashed on the nearby Polica mountain

External links

 Zawoja official web site
 Jewish Community in Zawoja on Virtual Shtetl

Villages in Sucha County
Ski areas and resorts in Poland